Gordon Pallister (2 April 1917 – 24 November 1999) was an English professional footballer who played as a left back.

Career
Born in Howden-le-Wear, Pallister joined Bradford City from Willington Juniors in May 1934. He made 28 league and 3 FA Cup appearances for the club. He moved to Barnsley in October 1938, making a further 220 league appearances for them before retiring in 1952.

Sources

References

1917 births
1999 deaths
English footballers
Bradford City A.F.C. players
Barnsley F.C. players
English Football League players
Association football fullbacks